A film scanner is a device made for scanning photographic film directly into a computer without the use of any intermediate printmaking. It provides several benefits over using a flatbed scanner to scan in a print of any size: the photographer has direct control over cropping and aspect ratio from the original, unmolested image on film; and many film scanners have special software or hardware that removes scratches and film grain and improves color reproduction from film.

Film scanners can accept either strips of 35 mm or 120 film, or individual slides. Low-end scanners typically only take 35mm film strips, while medium- and high-end film scanners often have interchangeable film loaders. This allows the one scanning platform to be used for different sizes and packaging. For example, some allow microscope slides to be loaded for scanning, while mechanised slide loaders allow many individual slides to be batch scanned unattended.

Some software used to process images scanned by film scanners allows for automatic color correction based on the film manufacturer and type.  In many cases the source film may not be marked with this information in human-readable form, but might be marked at the bottom edge with a DX film edge barcode following a standard maintained by ANSI and I3A.

Dust and scratches
Dust and scratches on the film can be a big problem for scanning. Because of their reduced size (compared to prints), the scanners are capable of resolutions much higher than a regular flatbed scanner; typically at least 2000 samples per inch (spi), up to 4000 spi or more. At these resolutions dust and scratches take on gigantic proportions. Even small specks of dust, invisible to the naked eye, can obscure a cluster of several pixels. For this reason, techniques have been developed to remove their appearance from a scan, see film restoration.

The simplest is the median filter, often called despeckle in many graphic manipulation programs, e.g. in Adobe Photoshop and the GIMP. It works by examining a pixel in relation to the pixels surrounding it; if it is too different from the surrounding pixels then it is replaced with one set to their median value. This and other methods can be quite effective but have the disadvantage that the filter cannot know what actually is dust or noise. It will also degrade fine detail in the scan.

Infrared cleaning

Infrared cleaning works by collecting an infrared channel from the scan at the same time as the visible colour channels (red, green, and blue). This is done by using a light source that also produces infrared radiation, and having a fourth row of sensors on the linear CCD sensor. Photographic film is mostly transparent to infrared radiation (no matter what the visible image contains) but dust and scratches aren't, so they show up in the IR channel. This information can then be used to automatically remove the appearance of dust and scratches in the visible channels and replace them with something similar to their surroundings. A major limitation of this technique is that it can only be used on dye-based (color and chromogenic black-and-white) films; the image-forming silver particles in most black-and-white film stocks are opaque to infrared radiation.

Scanner manufacturers usually have their own name attached to this technique. Kodak developed Digital ICE at their Austin development centre, and is licensed by Epson, Konica Minolta, Microtek, Minolta, Nikon, and some others. Canon developed its own FARE (Film Automatic Retouching and Enhancement) system. LaserSoft Imaging developed the iSRD dust and scratch removal, on which among others Plustek is relying.

See also
 Image scanner
 Motion picture film scanner

External links
 
 .
 .

Photography equipment
Image scanners